Music to Remember is a Canadian music television series which aired on CBC Television in 1970.

Premise
This series featured Lucio Agostini with an orchestra who presented popular and concert songs. Singers Shirley Harmer and Wally Koster were guests on this series as was violinist Marta Hidy.

Scheduling
This half-hour series was broadcast Sundays at 5:00 p.m. (Eastern) from 19 April to 24 May 1970.

References

External links
 

CBC Television original programming
1970 Canadian television series debuts
1970 Canadian television series endings
1970s Canadian music television series